Volia-Baranetska is a village (selo) in western Ukraine, in Sambir Raion (district) of Lviv Oblast (province). Volia-Baranetska belongs to Biskovychi rural hromada, one of the hromadas of Ukraine. Before the new administrative divisions of Ukraine were introduced in 2020, it was located at the three-way administrative border with Mostyska Raion and Staryi Sambir Raion.

References

Villages in Sambir Raion